Giulio or Giuliano Traballesi or Trabellesi (1727–1812) was an Italian designer and engraver.

Biography
He was born in Florence. After training with Agostino Veracini and Francesco Conti in Florence, Trabellesi studied architecture under Antonio Galli-Bibiena. He widened his experience by studying painting based on the works of Antonio da Correggio of Parma and those of painters from Bologna. In 1775, he became professor of painting at the Brera Academy of Milan, where his style reflected the reigning neoclassicism of Mengs. He painted in Milan for the residences of the Busca and Serbelloni. Among his pupils at the academy was Andrea Appiani.

His drawings for the collection of portraits of illustrious Florentines was engraved by Giuseppe Allegrini and others. He made etchings after Italian painters of the School of Bologna, among them: 
The Communion of St. Jerome after Agostino Carracci
Saints Alo & Petronius kneeling before Virgin & Conversion of St. Paul after Ludovico Carracci
The Circumcision after Reni
Communion of St. Catharine after Giacomo Cavedone

References

Artists from Florence
Italian engravers
18th-century Italian painters
Italian male painters
19th-century Italian painters
Painters from Milan
1812 deaths
1727 births
Academic staff of Brera Academy
19th-century Italian male artists
18th-century Italian male artists